The Nzérékoré Region is a region in the southern part of Guinea. Its capital and largest city is Nzérékoré. It is one of the eight regions of Guinea. It is bordered by the countries of Sierra Leone, Liberia, and Ivory Coast, and the Guinean regions of Kankan and Faranah.

Administrative divisions
Nzérékoré Region is divided into six prefectures; which are further sub-divided into 66 sub-prefectures:

 Beyla Prefecture
 Guéckédou Prefecture
 Lola Prefecture
 Macenta Prefecture
 Nzérékoré Prefecture 
 Yomou Prefecture

Geography
Nzérékoré Region is traversed by the northwesterly line of equal latitude and longitude.

The region includes several forested highlands, including the Nimba Range, Simandou Massif, and Ziama Massif.

The region contains the headwaters of several rivers. The Milo, Sankarani, and Dion rivers flow northward to become tributaries the Niger River. The Moa, Lofa, St. Paul, St. John, Cavalla, and Sassandra rivers flow southwards through Sierra Leone, Liberia, and Ivory Coast to empty into the Atlantic Ocean.

Gallery

See also 
Guinea
Nzérékoré
Forest Guinea
Mount Nimba Strict Nature Reserve
Ziama Massif
Bossou

References

 
Regions of Guinea